America West Airlines Flight 556 was a regularly scheduled flight from Miami, Florida, to Phoenix, Arizona, operated by an America West Airlines Airbus A319. On July 1, 2002, the plane was ordered back to the terminal after the pilots were suspected of being drunk beyond the legal limit. The pilots were ultimately convicted of operating an aircraft while intoxicated.

Background
On June 30, Captain Thomas Cloyd ,44, and First Officer Christopher Hughes ,42, flew from Phoenix to Miami. That night, they entered Mr. Moe's, a sports bar in Miami's Coconut Grove neighborhood, along with the three flight attendants scheduled to fly with them on Flight 556 the next morning. At 10:30 p.m. that night, Cloyd opened up a tab. Over the next six hours, Cloyd and Hughes drank seven 34-ounce beers, seven 16-ounce beers, one draft beer of unspecified size, and a martini. They also ate a hamburger. The tab ran to US$122.28, to which Hughes added a $20 tip. The bar staff finally kicked the men out at 4:45 a.m. after they knocked over a bar stool, and Cloyd and Hughes returned to their hotel at 5:30 a.m. The flight attendants had left the bar several hours earlier.

A shuttle arrived at the hotel to pick up Cloyd, Hughes, and the flight attendants at 9:30 a.m. However, they had to wait about 20 minutes for Hughes, who entered looking somewhat disheveled. Flight 556 was scheduled to leave for Sky Harbor International Airport in Phoenix at 10:38 a.m. When the shuttle arrived at Miami International Airport, the pilots stopped at Starbucks Coffee before going to the security checkpoint. A security screener asked Cloyd to throw away his coffee cup, but Cloyd refused. When a supervisor was called and tried to get him to comply, Cloyd responded, "that shit doesn't apply to me." However, Cloyd finally threw away his coffee cup after police were called. Several screeners reported smelling alcohol on the pilots' breath and asked a ground security coordinator to speak with them at the gate. When she noted that there were concerns Cloyd and Hughes were drunk, Cloyd blamed it on bad breath. However, the supervisor had already called the Transportation Security Administration (TSA), who then alerted the police.

By the time police arrived, the aircraft had already been pushed off the bridge by the tug. However, the police and TSA ordered the plane back to the terminal after receiving complaints about Cloyd and Hughes being drunk. When the pilots were given field sobriety test, they failed, and were arrested at 11:45 a.m. for operating an aircraft while intoxicated, a felony in Florida. America West canceled the flight and arranged for the 127 passengers to fly to Phoenix on other airlines.

At the police station, Cloyd and Hughes both consented to a breathalyzer test. Cloyd's blood alcohol content was 0.091; Hughes' was 0.084. Both results were above Florida's motor vehicle legal limit of 0.08, and more than double the Federal Aviation Administration's limit of 0.04. America West terminated Cloyd and Hughes the next day, and the FAA grounded them on July 4. Cloyd had worked for America West since 1990; Hughes since 1999. At the time, America West had a policy that barred its pilots from drinking 12 hours before a flight, meaning that Cloyd and Hughes' careers were in jeopardy shortly after they opened their bar tab. This was stricter than the FAA's requirement that pilots do not drink for eight hours before a flight. It later emerged that Cloyd had submitted false information when applying to America West as he had two previous undisclosed alcohol-related offenses.

Trial
Cloyd and Hughes were subsequently indicted by a Miami-Dade County grand jury on one count each of operating an aircraft while intoxicated. They were released on $7,500 bail.

The pilots tried to get the case thrown out, contending that the federal government had exclusive jurisdiction over aviation safety unless there is a loss of life, serious injury, or damage to property. In 2003, a federal judge agreed with the pilots. This was critical, because federal law allows for prosecution only if one's blood alcohol content is 0.10 or higher. The pilots were below that standard (although they were far above the FAA standard), raising the possibility that they would escape federal charges. However, the 11th Circuit Court of Appeals ruled that Florida did have jurisdiction over the case and that its prosecution had to run its course before federal courts got involved. The Supreme Court refused to consider the case. The pilots then negotiated a plea bargain in which they would have pleaded guilty in return for 14-month prison terms. However, Circuit Court Judge David Young rejected the deal, and the trial began in May 2005.

The main issue of the trial was the definition of "operating an aircraft." In order to get a conviction, the state had to prove the pilots were in control of the plane while under the influence of alcohol. The prosecution contended that the pilots were operating the aircraft from the moment they assumed responsibility for the plane. An America West operations manager testified that Cloyd signed a dispatch release accepting responsibility for the Airbus. When they arrived on the plane, prosecutors said, Cloyd and Hughes began several steps to complete the operation process. Hughes performed several safety checks and received clearance to input flight directives. The prosecution also heavily stressed Cloyd and Hughes' blood alcohol levels, which were taken nearly three hours after they arrived at the airport and over seven hours after they had their last drink. One state witness even suggested that at the time they arrived on the plane, the pilots may have had blood alcohol levels as high as 0.15.

The defense contended that the order to return the plane to the terminal was issued before the plane was released from the tug. They argued that there was no steering at the time, and therefore the pilots were never in control of the plane. The defense called only one witness, tug operator Franklin Tejeda, who said that he never relinquished control of the plane since there was a steel rod attached to the nose wheel. As long as the rod was attached, Tejeda said, the pilots could not steer the plane. However, the prosecution got him to admit that he only began driving the tug when ordered to do so by the pilots. This admission by Tejeda was a fatal blow to Cloyd and Hughes' defense. On June 8, after six hours of deliberation, a six-man jury convicted Cloyd and Hughes of operating an aircraft while intoxicated.

In sentencing on July 20, Young called Cloyd and Hughes' behavior "outrageous," especially in light of the September 11, 2001 attacks. He sentenced Cloyd to the maximum sentence of five years in prison and sentenced Hughes to 2.5 years in prison. In addition, both men were fined $5,000 and were placed on a period of probation after they were released, during which they had to perform community service and not be allowed to fly a plane.

Hughes, inmate number M51696, and Cloyd, inmate number M51697, were released on July 21, 2007 and September 5, 2009, respectively.

See also
 Aero Flight 311, a DC-3 that was being flown by alcohol-intoxicated and sleep-deprived pilots crashed in Kvevlax, Finland (Koivulahti in Finnish), with a loss of all 25 on board. The accident remains the deadliest in Finnish aviation history.
 Japan Air Lines Cargo Flight 1045, a DC-8 that was being flown by an alcohol-intoxicated captain crashed at Anchorage Ted Stevens International Airport, Alaska, United States, with the loss of all five on board.
 List of accidents and incidents involving commercial aircraft

References

External links
Court TV coverage of trial (Archive)
The $142.28 bar tab

556
Airliner accidents and incidents in Florida
Aviation accidents and incidents in the United States in 2002
2002 in Florida
July 2002 events in the United States
Driving under the influence